Hannah Lisa Witton (born 19 February 1992) is an English-German YouTuber, broadcaster, and author. Witton creates video blogs and informational content which is mostly based around relationships, sex and sexual health; liberation and welfare issues; literature; and travel.

Witton's debut book, Doing It, concentrating on sex and relationships, was released for European readers on 6 April 2017 and in America on 3 July 2018. Her second book, The Hormone Diaries: The Bloody Truth About Our Periods, was released in June 2019.

Early life and education
Though she grew up in England, Witton lived in Austin, Texas for one year as a child. She is Jewish. Her godfather is the actor Toby Jones. She attended Loreto Sixth Form College in Hulme, Manchester, and then the University of Birmingham where she studied a degree in History and was especially interested in sexual history. Witton's video History of Homosexuality was a 2013 finalist in The Guardian and Oxford University Press Very Short Film competition.

Career
In 2017 Witton won a UK Blog Award, and in 2018 a Blogosphere Award as Vlogger of the Year. Witton is the sole director of Snake People Media Ltd incorporated on 18 March 2016.

YouTube
Witton began creating YouTube videos on 17 April 2011 as Hannah "Girasol". She is known for her videos helping young women with sexual health and relationships. She moderated the Gender panel at Summer in the City 2014. Witton was named one of eight Girls' Champions as part of the BBC's 100 Women campaign in November 2016.

Hannah Witton is one of the three members of the internet-based reading club, known as "Banging Book Club". She and two colleagues, fellow Youtubers Lucy Moon and Leena Norms, read one book every month and then discuss the book together on a podcast published on iTunes, SoundCloud, and (partially) Witton's YouTube channel. They sometimes invite guests to their podcast. The books often include themes related to sex, relationships, and feminism.

Witton started her second Youtube channel, "More Hannah", at the end of 2019 to post lifestyle and productivity content. Her main channel has featured series like The Hormone Diaries where she is currently documenting her fertility journey in trying to conceive.

Writing

Witton's first book, Doing It!: Let's Talk About Sex, was released on 6 April 2017 in Europe and in America on 3 July 2018. The book concentrates on sex and relationships including personal experiences, and won a SitC 2017 award. In 2019, Untendrumherumreden, the German translation, was published.

Her second book, The Hormone Diaries: The Bloody Truth About Our Periods, covering experiences of menstruation and education around it, was released in June 2019.

Podcast
In May 2019, Witton launched a podcast Doing It with Hannah Witton focusing on sex, relationships, taboos and our bodies. The podcast follows an interview format where Witton invites a guest to talk about a topic where they have expertise, in conversation. The podcast is distributed by Global, and was nominated in the podcast category in the 2020 Global Awards.

TV and radio
Witton presented the ITV2 sex and relationships show Love Fix in February 2016.

Witton was a guest presenter for BBC Radio 5 Live on issues to do with sex and relationships, and has been a guest on various BBC radio talk segments on many occasions. Witton had a weekly radio show The Hannah Witton Show and co-presented an episode of The Calum McSwiggan Show on internet radio station Fubar Radio, and has presented the BBC Radio 1 segment The Internet Takeover.

Personal life
After a bad flare of ulcerative colitis, Witton underwent ileostomy in January 2018. In December she was a panelist in the "Sex and Science" discussion for the Yogscast Jingle Jam charity.

Witton proposed to Daniel "Dan" Leadley, older brother of fellow Youtuber and singer-songwriter Bethan Leadley, in August 2019. They married in September 2020. In November 2021, Witton confirmed that the couple were expecting their first child together, due in late April 2022. Witton gave birth to her son, weighing 9lb, on 30 April, via "an unplanned but very calm c-section"; adding that he spent his first night receiving neonatal care.

In 2022, Witton became a German citizen, in addition to her British citizenship.

Bibliography
 Doing It: Let's Talk About Sex... (Wren & Rook 2017)
 The Hormone Diaries: The Bloody Truth About Our Periods (Wren & Rook 2019)

See also 

 List of YouTubers
 Rose and Rosie

References

External links 
 
 

Living people
1992 births
21st-century English women writers
Alumni of Loreto College, Manchester
Alumni of the University of Birmingham
Articles containing video clips
British women podcasters
Citizens of Germany through descent
English feminists
English Jewish writers
English people of German descent
English podcasters
English video bloggers
English women non-fiction writers
People from Moss Side
Sex educators
YouTube vloggers
20th-century English women
20th-century English people